Aïssa Bilal Laïdouni (born 13 December 1996) is a professional footballer who plays as a midfielder for Bundesliga club Union Berlin. Born in France, he plays for the Tunisia national team.

Club career
A youth exponent from the club, Laïdouni made his Ligue 1 debut with Angers on 2 April 2016 against Troyes.

On 20 April 2021, Laïdouni won the 2020–21 Nemzeti Bajnokság I season with Ferencváros by beating archrival Újpest FC 3–0 at the Groupama Arena. He wears shirt number 93, a nod to his hometown of Livry-Gargan, a commune in the northeastern suburbs of Paris, France.

International career
Laïdouni was born in France, and is of Algerian and Tunisian descent. He was called up to represent the senior Tunisia national team on 19 March 2021. He made his debut  on 25 March 2021 in an AFCON 2021 qualifier against Libya.

Career statistics

Club

Honours
Ferencváros
 Nemzeti Bajnokság I: 2020–21; 2021–22
 Magyar Kupa: 2021–22

Individual
 Nemzeti Bajnokság I Most Valuable Player: 2020–21

References

External links
 
 

1996 births
Living people
People from Montfermeil
Tunisian footballers
Tunisia international footballers
French footballers
Tunisian people of Algerian descent
French sportspeople of Tunisian descent
French sportspeople of Algerian descent
Association football midfielders
2021 Africa Cup of Nations players
2022 FIFA World Cup players
Ligue 1 players
Angers SCO players
Championnat National players
Les Herbiers VF players
FC Chambly Oise players
Liga I players
FC Voluntari players
Nemzeti Bajnokság I players
Ferencvárosi TC footballers
Bundesliga players
1. FC Union Berlin players
Tunisian expatriate footballers
French expatriate footballers
Tunisian expatriate sportspeople in Romania
Expatriate footballers in Romania
Tunisian expatriate sportspeople in Hungary
Expatriate footballers in Hungary
Tunisian expatriate sportspeople in Germany
Expatriate footballers in Germany